GGA may refer to: Global Governance Authority Founded in March 2022 

 Gga (Devanagari) (ॻ), used in Sindhi
 Apostolic Generation Church, an Indonesian church
 Gao language
 Generalized gradient approximation
 Georges Giralt PhD Award, a European scientific award in robotics 
 Girl Guides Australia 
 Goemon's Great Adventure, a 1998 video game
 Golden Gate Academy, in San Francisco, California, United States
 Gongora, a genus of orchid
 Good girl art
 Gossip Girl: Acapulco, a Mexican television series
 Governor-General of Australia
 Hotel and Restaurant Workers' Union (Austria), a former Austrian trade union
 GGA, a codon for the amino acid glycine